Theodoros Voutiritsas (Greek: Θεόδωρος Βουτιρίτσας; born 27 July 1962) is a Greek former professional football player. He played only for AEL for all of his career.

Voutiritsas wrote history while wearing the club's jersey, being one of the team's golden generation of players. During the 1980s, AEL won both the National Cup and the Greek League with a team consisting almost entirely of local football talents and Voutiritsas being one of them. He was the master of the team's midfield and the brain of the team, since most offensive plays began at his feet. He was famous for his ability to use both of his legs with equal skill and quality.

He is recognized as one of the great characters who shaped the history of Larissa. He is currently involved in scouting for young talents. Furthermore, he also owns a Football Academy in his hometown, Larissa. He also acted as Assistant Manager of Larissa for a period of almost a year recently.

Managerial statistics
Updated 2 April 2017

International career
Voutiritsas appeared in seven matches for the senior Greece national football team from 1984 to 1989.

References

External links

1962 births
Living people
Footballers from Larissa
Greek footballers
Greece international footballers
Athlitiki Enosi Larissa F.C. players
Association football midfielders